Prosopofrontina is a genus of parasitic flies in the family Tachinidae. There are about 13 described species in Prosopofrontina.

Species
These 13 species belong to the genus Prosopofrontina:

 Prosopofrontina angustifrons (Townsend, 1928)
 Prosopofrontina bicolor (Villeneuve, 1937)
 Prosopofrontina cerina (Mesnil, 1977)
 Prosopofrontina conifrons (Villeneuve, 1950)
 Prosopofrontina crucigera (Mesnil, 1977)
 Prosopofrontina flava (Curran, 1927)
 Prosopofrontina frontosa (Villeneuve, 1950)
 Prosopofrontina grossa Chao, 1982
 Prosopofrontina latifrons (Mesnil, 1961)
 Prosopofrontina luteipes (Mesnil, 1953)
 Prosopofrontina malaisei (Mesnil, 1961)
 Prosopofrontina pulchra Townsend, 1926
 Prosopofrontina shanxiensis Chao & Liu, 1985

References

Further reading

 
 
 
 

Tachinidae
Articles created by Qbugbot